The Buh Cossack Host was a Cossack host, which used to be located along the Southern Buh River.

The Buh Cossack Host was formed in 1769 out of Ukrainians, Vlachs, and Bulgarians, who had taken the side of Russia during the Russo-Turkish War of 1768-1774. After the war, the regiment was quartered on the Southern Buh River. In 1788, the Buh Cossack Host became a part of the Yekaterinoslav Cossack Host (disbanded in 1796) and protected the border. It was disbanded in 1800, only to be created again in 1803 under the original name. The Buh Cossack Host had to provide three regiments of 500 men each in the times of war. In 1817, it was included into the military settlements and combined with the two Ukrainian regiments into a Buh Uhlan Division.

References 

18th century in the Zaporozhian Host
Cossack hosts